Robert W. Corell (born November 4, 1934, in Detroit, Michigan) is an American global climate scientist, principal for the Global Environment & Technology Foundation, an ambassador for ClimateWorks, professor II at the University of the Arctic's new Institute of Circumpolar Reindeer Husbandry, a professor II at the University of Tromso, and director of the Sarasota, Florida-based Climate Adaptation Center (CAC). He is a partner of the Sustainability Institute and its C-ROADS Climate Interactive Initiative, and head of US Office for the Global Energy Assessment. 
In 1996 he was Awarded Brazilian Order of Scientific Merit by the President of Brazil. In 2003 a Mountain region in Antarctic was named the "Corell Cirque" in his honor. He contributed to the assessment reports of the Intergovernmental Panel on Climate Change, an organisation that was co-awarded the 2007 Nobel Peace Prize, and in 2010 he was awarded an honorary Doctor of Veterinarian Medicine by the Norges veterinærhøgskole (Norwegian School of Veterinarian Science).
He joined the H. John Heinz III Center for Science, Economics and the Environment in 2006 as vice president for programs and policy (until January 2010).

Corell served as an affiliate of the Washington Advisory Group and is a senior policy fellow at the Policy Program of the American Meteorological Society. He recently completed an appointment that began in January 2000 as a senior research fellow in the Belfer Center for Science and International Affairs at Harvard University's Kennedy School of Government. Corell has been quoted in the Washington Post, Vanity Fair, Golf Digest, CBS News' 60 Minutes, and many additional public media outlets such as Skavlan. Corell is actively engaged in research concerned with the sciences of global change and the interface between science and public policy, particularly research activities that are focused on global and regional climate change, related environmental issues, and science to facilitate understanding of vulnerability and sustainable development. He co-chairs an international strategic planning group that is developing a strategy designed to harness science, technology, and innovation for sustainable development; serves as the chair of the Arctic Climate Impact Assessment; counsels as senior science advisor to ManyOne.Net; and is chair of the board of the Digital Universe Foundation. Corell was assistant director for Geosciences at the National Science Foundation, where he had oversight for the Atmospheric, Earth, and Ocean Sciences and the global change programs of the National Science Foundation (NSF). He was also a professor and academic administrator at the University of New Hampshire. Corell is an oceanographer and engineer by background and training, having received Ph.D., M.S., and B.S. degrees at Case Western Reserve University and MIT. He has also held appointments at the Woods Hole Institution of Oceanography, the Scripps Institution of Oceanography, the University of Washington, and Case Western Reserve University.

References

Living people
1934 births
21st-century American engineers
American oceanographers
American climatologists
Harvard Kennedy School staff
Commanders of the National Order of Scientific Merit (Brazil)
Case Western Reserve University alumni
Massachusetts Institute of Technology alumni
University of Washington faculty
University of New Hampshire faculty
Case Western Reserve University faculty